Henry of Laach (in German: Heinrich von Laach) was the first count palatine of the Rhine (1085/1087–1095). Henry was the son of Herman I, count of Gleiberg. Henry was a follower of Henry IV, Holy Roman Emperor. He had lands in the southeastern Eifel and on the Moselle River.

Most of the holdings of Hermann II, Count Palatine fell back to the emperor, when Hermann died without successor. The emperor named Henry count palatine of the Rhine and during the emperor's trip to Italy tasked Henry to hold interim judicial councils. Henry married Herman's widow, Adelaide of Weimar-Orlamünde (d. 1100). From this marriage, Henry may have taken control over some of her holdings along the Moselle. As a consequence, the geographic center of the palatinate moved towards the south.

With his wife, Adelaide, Henry founded the Maria Laach Abbey. He was succeeded by his stepson, Siegfried of Ballenstedt.

References

Sources

1095 deaths
Counts Palatine of the Rhine
Year of birth unknown